François Colletet (1628-1680?) was a French poet, the son of the poet Guillaume Colletet. His poetry was considered inferior to that of his father and he was ridiculed by Nicolas Boileau.

Works
Noëls nouveaux, 1660 
the Tracas de Paris, 1665 
the Muse coquette, 1665

Sources

External links
 

1628 births
1680 deaths
French poets
17th-century French writers
17th-century French male writers
French male poets